The 15th Asian Table Tennis Championships 2000 were held in Doha, Qatar, from 1 to 8 May 2000. It was organised by the Qatar Table Tennis Association under the authority of Asian Table Tennis Union (ATTU) and International Table Tennis Federation (ITTF).

Medal summary

Medal table

Events

See also
2000 World Table Tennis Championships
Asian Cup

References

Asian Table Tennis Championships
Asian Table Tennis Championships
Table Tennis Championships
Table tennis competitions in Qatar
Asian Table Tennis Championships
Asian Table Tennis Championships